Ivan Ahčin (March 9, 1897, Domžale – February 16, 1960) was a Slovene sociologist, journalist, author and politician.

He studied theology at the University of Ljubljana, where he graduated in 1925. He later worked as a professor of sociology at the University of Ljubljana. Between 1929 and 1941 he was also the editor of the daily newspaper Slovenec, the official organ of the Slovene People's Party and one of the two most influential newspapers in Slovenia. He was one of the closest collaborators of the conservative Slovene politician Anton Korošec.

After the Axis invasion of Yugoslavia in April 1941, Ahčin co-operated with Marko Natlačen, former governor of the Drava Banovina in the Kingdom of Yugoslavia, who advocated the collaboration with the Italian occupation authorities of the Province of Ljubljana. After the assassination of Natlačen by Slovene Communist agents in October 1942, Ahčin emigrated to Rome, from where he contacted the Yugoslav government in exile in London, and became one of the main advisors of the exiled Slovene conservative politician Miha Krek. In Rome, he also established contacts with Janko Kralj, a Slovene exile from Gorizia: the two helped many anti-Nazis to escape Nazi persecution between 1943 and 1944, when Rome was under German occupation.

After 1945, Ahčin moved to Argentina, where he worked as a professor on the Faculty for Theology of the University of Buenos Aires. He died in Buenos Aires.

In 1999, two historians from Ljubljana, Bojan Godeša and Ervin Dolenc, published his memories of the period when he worked with Anton Korošec. The book, entitled Izgubljeni spomin na Antona Korošca ("The Lost Memory on Anton Korošec"), was published by the publishing house Nova revija and reopened the discussion of the role of Anton Korošec in Slovene history.

Books 
 Komunizem: največja nevarnost naše dobe ("Communism: the Greatest Danger of Our Time", 1939)
 Prostozidarstvo ("Freemasonry", 1941)
 Sociologija I ("Sociology I", textbook, 1953)
 Sociologija II ("Sociology II", textbook, 1955)
 Socialna ekonomija ("Social Economy", textbook, 1958)

References 
 Slovenski veliki leksikon (Ljubljana: Mladinska knjiga, 2003)

1897 births
1960 deaths
People from Domžale
20th-century Slovenian Roman Catholic priests
Slovene People's Party (historical) politicians
Slovenian journalists
Slovenian theologians
Slovenian sociologists
Slovenian editors
Slovenian people of World War II
Yugoslav emigrants to Argentina
University of Ljubljana alumni
Academic staff of the University of Ljubljana
Academic staff of the University of Buenos Aires
Argentine people of Slovenian descent
Yugoslav Roman Catholic priests
20th-century journalists
20th-century Argentine Roman Catholic priests